A soundtrack is recorded music accompanying and synchronized to the images of a motion picture, television program or video game.

Soundtrack or The Soundtrack may also refer to:


Music
 Soundtrack (Charles Lloyd album), 1969
  Soundtracks (Can album), 1970
 Soundtrack (Fullerton College Jazz Band album), 1990
 Soundtracks for the Blind, 1996 album by Swans
 Soundtrack (Guy Barker album), 2002
 Soundtrack (Modern English album), 2010
 The Taking (album) (working title: The Soundtrack), an album by Loaded, 2011
 Soundtrack (Wizards of Oz album), 1988
 Soundtrack (EP), a 2022 EP by Fastball
 "Soundtrack", an instrumental song by Linkin Park from the 2011 LP Underground Eleven
 "The Soundtrack" (The Game song), 2014 single

Other uses
 Soundtrack (film), a 2011 Bollywood drama
 Soundtrack Pro, from 2003, an audio editor
 Soundtrack '08, a one-time 2008 music festival
 Soundtrack (TV series), a 2019 Netflix musical drama
 Soundtrack #1, a 2022 South Korean streaming television series

See also
 Audio signal, audio channel or audio track, a component of a sound recording
 Original Soundtrack (disambiguation)
 Soundtrack album
 Soundtracks (disambiguation)